GSAT-8 or INSAT-4G is communication satellite. It was constructed by the Indian Space Research Organisation, as part of INSAT system. GSAT-8 was launched on May 21, 2011, from Kourou, French Guiana. The rocket, an Ariane 5 was the carrier, marketed by the European Arianespace. First satellite to carry GAGAN payload followed up by GSAT-10 and in-orbit spare GSAT-15.

Launch
Prior to launch, the spacecraft was transported from India to Cayenne – Rochambeau Airport in French Guiana by an Antonov An-124 cargo aircraft. The success of the launch is said to have made up for the previous loss of two satellites on the indigenous GSLV rocket. GSAT-8 was co-located with INSAT-3E at 55°E.

References

GSAT satellites
INSAT satellites
Spacecraft launched in 2011
2011 in India
Communications satellites in geostationary orbit
Ariane commercial payloads